John Arthur Oxley (29 December 1922 – 1 June 1976) was a British ice hockey player. He competed in the men's tournament at the 1948 Winter Olympics.

References

1922 births
1976 deaths
English ice hockey players
Ice hockey players at the 1948 Winter Olympics
Olympic ice hockey players of Great Britain
Sportspeople from Hastings